Darwinia purpurea, commonly known as the rose darwinia, is a species of flowering plant in the family Myrtaceae and is endemic to the southwest of Western Australia. It is a spreading shrub with linear leaves and dense heads of red or yellow flowers surrounded by many overlapping involucral bracts.

Description
The flowers are arranged in dense, hemispherical heads surrounded by a large number of overlapping egg-shaped or spatula-shaped involucral bracts that are slightly longer than the flowers. Flowering occurs from July to December.

Taxonomy
This species was first formally described in 1838 by Stephan Endlicher who gave it the name Polyzone purpurea in Stirpium Australasicarum Herbarii Hugeliani Decades Tres. In 1865, George Bentham changed the name to Darwinia purpurea in Journal of the Linnean Society, Botany. The specific epithet (purpurea) means "purple".

Distribution and habitat
Rose darwinia is often found on undulating plains and amongst granite outcrops in the Avon Wheatbelt, Coolgardie, Geraldton Sandplains and Yalgoo of south-western Western Australia, where it grows in sandy or lateritic soils.

References

 

purpurea
Endemic flora of Western Australia
Myrtales of Australia
Rosids of Western Australia
Plants described in 1838
Taxa named by Stephan Endlicher